In mathematics, the amplitwist is a concept created by Tristan Needham in the book Visual Complex Analysis (1997) to represent the derivative of a complex function visually.

Definition

The amplitwist associated with a given function is its derivative in the complex plane. More formally, it is a complex number  such that in an infinitesimally small neighborhood of a point  in the complex plane,  for an infinitesimally small vector .

Uses

The concept of an amplitwist is used primarily in complex analysis to offer a way of visualizing the derivative of a complex-valued function as a local amplification and twist of vectors at a point in the complex plane.

Examples

Define the function . Consider the derivative of the function at the point .

References

Functions and mappings
Complex analysis